The Kelowna Wings were a junior ice hockey team based in Kelowna, British Columbia that played in the Western Hockey League from 1982–85. The Wings were abysmal in their three-year tenure, winning just 56 out of 216 games played. The franchise relocated to Spokane, Washington following the 1984–85 season and became the Spokane Chiefs.

The City of Kelowna would wait ten years for the WHL to return as the Tacoma Rockets relocated to the city and became a perennial contender.

Season-by-season Record

Note: GP = Games played, W = Wins, L = Losses, T = Ties Pts = Points, GF = Goals for, GA = Goals against

NHL Alumni

See also
List of ice hockey teams in British Columbia
Kelowna Rockets

References
2005–06 WHL Guide
hockeydb.com

Defunct ice hockey teams in British Columbia
Defunct Western Hockey League teams
Sport in Kelowna
1982 establishments in British Columbia
1985 disestablishments in British Columbia
Ice hockey clubs established in 1982
Sports clubs disestablished in 1985